The United States District Court for the Eastern District of Tennessee (in case citations, E.D. Tenn.) is the federal court in the Sixth Circuit whose jurisdiction covers most of East Tennessee and a portion of Middle Tennessee. The court has jurisdiction over 41 counties with 4 divisions. Based in Knoxville, Tennessee, it maintains branch facilities in Chattanooga, Tennessee; Greeneville, Tennessee; and Winchester, Tennessee.

 The Southern Division, based in Chattanooga, Tennessee, serves Bledsoe, Bradley, Hamilton, Marion, McMinn, Meigs, Polk, Rhea and Sequatchie counties.
 The Northeastern Division, based in Greeneville, Tennessee, serves Carter, Cocke, Greene, Hamblen, Hancock, Hawkins, Johnson, Sullivan, Unicoi and Washington counties.
 The Northern Division, based in Knoxville, Tennessee, serves Anderson, Blount, Campbell, Claiborne, Grainger, Jefferson, Knox, Loudon, Monroe, Morgan, Roane, Scott, Sevier and Union counties.
 The Winchester Division serves Bedford, Coffee, Franklin, Grundy, Lincoln, Moore, Warren and Van Buren counties.

The United States Attorney for the Eastern District of Tennessee represents the United States in civil and criminal litigation in the court.  the Interim United States Attorney is Francis M. Hamilton III.

The court was established by the Judiciary Act of 1801 ("Midnight Judges" Act) wherein Congress created a new Sixth Circuit with two districts in Tennessee. Since 1797, the state had been organized by Congress into one judicial district with one judge, John McNairy.

Tennessee – along with Kentucky, Ohio, and Michigan – is located within the area covered by United States Court of Appeals for the Sixth Circuit, and appeals are taken to that court (except for patent claims and claims against the U.S. government under the Tucker Act, which are appealed to the Federal Circuit).

History 

The United States District Court for the District of Tennessee was established with one judgeship on January 31, 1797, by 1 Stat. 496. The judgeship was filled by President George Washington's appointment of John McNairy.  Since Congress failed to assign the district to a circuit, the court had the jurisdiction of both a district court and a circuit court.  Appeals from this one district court went directly to the United States Supreme Court.

On February 13, 1801, in the famous "Midnight Judges" Act of 1801, 2 Stat. 89, Congress abolished the U.S. district court in Tennessee, and expanded the number of circuits to six, provided for independent circuit court judgeships, and abolished the necessity of Supreme Court Justices riding the circuits. It was this legislation which created the grandfather of the present Sixth Circuit. The act provided for a "Sixth Circuit" comprising two districts in the State of Tennessee, one district in the State of Kentucky and one district, called the Ohio District, composed of the Ohio and Indiana territories (the latter including the present State of Michigan). The new Sixth Circuit Court was to be held at "Bairdstown" in the District of Kentucky, at Knoxville in the District of East Tennessee, at Nashville in the District of West Tennessee, and at Cincinnati in the District of Ohio. Unlike the other circuits which were provided with three circuit judges, the Sixth Circuit was to have only one circuit judge with district judges from Kentucky and Tennessee comprising the rest of the court. Any two judges constituted a quorum. New circuit judgeships were to be created as district judgeships in Kentucky and Tennessee became vacant.

The repeal of this Act restored the District on March 8, 1802, 2 Stat. 132. The District was divided into the Eastern and Western Districts on April 29, 1802. On February 24, 1807, Congress again abolished the two districts and created the United States Circuit for the District of Tennessee. On March 3, 1837, Congress assigned the judicial district of Tennessee to the Eighth Circuit. On June 18, 1839, by 5 Stat. 313, Congress divided Tennessee into three districts, Eastern, Middle, and Western. Again, only one judgeship was allotted for all three districts. On July 15, 1862, Congress reassigned appellate jurisdiction to the Sixth Circuit. Finally, on June 14, 1878, Congress authorized a separate judgeship for the Western District of Tennessee, at which time President Rutherford B. Hayes appointed David M. Key as judge for the Eastern and Middle Districts of Tennessee. The first judge to serve only the Eastern District of Tennessee was Robert Love Taylor, appointed by Harry S. Truman.

Current judges 
:

Former judges

Chief judges

Succession of seats

See also 
 Courts of Tennessee
 List of current United States district judges
 List of United States federal courthouses in Tennessee

References

External links 
 United States District Court for the Eastern District of Tennessee Official Website

Tennessee, Eastern District
East Tennessee
Tennessee law
Knoxville, Tennessee
Chattanooga, Tennessee
Greene County, Tennessee
Greeneville, Tennessee
Franklin County, Tennessee
Courthouses in Tennessee
1801 establishments in the United States
1802 disestablishments in the United States
1802 establishments in the United States
1807 disestablishments in the United States
1839 establishments in the United States
Courts and tribunals established in 1801
Courts and tribunals disestablished in 1802
Courts and tribunals established in 1802
Courts and tribunals disestablished in 1807
Courts and tribunals established in 1839